Helicodiscidae is a family of small air-breathing land snails, terrestrial pulmonate gastropod mollusks in the superfamily Punctoidea (according to the taxonomy of the Gastropoda by Bouchet & Rocroi, 2005).

Genera 
Genera within the family include:
 Lucilla Lowe, 1852
 Subfamily Helicodiscinae Pilsbry, 1927
 Chanomphalus Strebel & Pfeffer, 1879 
 Helicodiscus Morse, 1864 - the type genus
  Polygyriscus Pilsbry, 1948
 Speleodiscoides A.G. Smith, 1957
  Radiodiscus - may belong in the Charopidae
 Subfamily Stenopylinae Thiele, 1931
  Stenopylis Fulton, 1914
  Zilchogyra
Synonyms
 Coarctatio F. Haas, 1945: synonym of Stenopylis Fulton, 1914 (junior synonym)
 Hebetodiscus H. B. Baker, 1929: synonym of Lucilla R. T. Lowe, 1852
  Hydrophrea Climo, 1974: synonym of Lucilla R. T. Lowe, 1852

References

 Bank, R. A. (2017). Classification of the Recent terrestrial Gastropoda of the World. Last update: July 16th, 2017

External links